Kravany is a village and municipality in the Trebišov District in the Košice Region of eastern Slovakia.

External links
https://web.archive.org/web/20100202015957/http://www.statistics.sk/mosmis/eng/run.html

Villages and municipalities in Trebišov District
Zemplín (region)